The Party of Danube Serbs was a Serb minority political party in Croatia. It was formed as the Serbian Radical Party of the Republic of Serbian Krajina by Rade Leskovac in the early 1990s. Following the switching of power to Croatia over the previous Serbian Autonomous Oblast of Eastern Slavonia, Baranja and Western Srem, the party was re-registered under its current name, with Leskovac remaining in the role of party leader. The party no longer supports the Greater Serbia concept.

Leskovac caused a controversy in 2007 when election posters featured him giving a Serbian three-fingered salute were posted around the city of Vukovar, which is considered an aggressive Serbian nationalist symbol by many ethnic Croats.

The Party was erased from Register of political parties sometime between 2012 and 2015.

See also
Serbian Radical Party

References

External links
Party of Danube Serbs at HIDRA
Party flag

Political parties established in 1998
Joint Council of Municipalities
1998 establishments in Croatia
Conservative parties in Croatia
Regionalist parties in Croatia
Serbian Radical Party
Serb political parties in Croatia
Serb nationalist parties